Beauvais is a city and commune in northern France, and prefecture of the Oise département, in the Hauts-de-France region,  north of Paris. 

The commune of Beauvais had a population of 56,020 , making it the most populous city in the Oise department, and third most-populous in Picardy. Together with its suburbs and satellite towns, the metropolitan area of Beauvais has a population of 128,020.

The region around Beauvais is called the Beauvaisis.

History 
Beauvais was known to the Romans by the Gallo-Roman name of Caesaromagus (magos is Common Celtic for "field"). The post-Renaissance Latin rendering is Bellovacum from the Belgic tribe the Bellovaci, whose capital it was. In the ninth century it became a county (comté), which about 1013 passed to the bishops of Beauvais, who became peers of France from the twelfth century. At the coronations of kings the Bishop of Beauvais wore the royal mantle and went, with the Bishop of Langres, to raise the king from his throne to present him to the people.

De Bello Gallico II 13 reports that as Julius Caesar was approaching a fortified town called Bratuspantium in the land of the Bellovaci, its inhabitants surrendered to him when he was about 5 Roman miles away. Its name is Gaulish for "place where judgements are made", from *bratu-spantion. Some say that Bratuspantium is Beauvais. Others theorize that it is Vendeuil-Caply or Bailleul sur Thérain.

From 1004 to 1037, the Count of Beauvais was Odo II, Count of Blois.

In a charter dated 1056/1060, Eudo of Brittany granted land "in pago Belvacensi" (Beauvais, Picardy) to the Abbey of Angers Saint-Aubin (see Albinus of Angers).

In 1346, the town had to defend itself against the English, who again besieged it in 1433. The siege which it endured in 1472 at the hands of the Duke of Burgundy was rendered famous by the heroism of the town's women, under the leadership of Jeanne Hachette, whose memory is still celebrated by a procession on 27 June (the feast of Sainte Angadrême), during which women take precedence over men.

An interesting hoard of coins from the High Middle Ages became known as the Beauvais Hoard, because some of the English and European coins found with the lot were from the French abbey located in Beauvais. The hoard, which contained a variety of rare and extremely rare Anglo-Norman pennies, English and foreign coins, was reputed to have been found in or near Paris.

Beauvais was extensively damaged during World War I, and again in World War II during the German advance on Paris in June 1940. Much of the older part of the city was all but destroyed, and the cathedral badly damaged before being liberated by British forces on 30 August 1944.

Geography 
Beauvais lies at the foot of wooded hills on the left bank of the Thérain at its confluence with the Avelon. Its ancient ramparts have been destroyed, and it is now surrounded by boulevards, outside of which run branches of the Thérain. In addition, there are spacious promenades in the north-east of the town.

Climate
Beauvais experiences an oceanic climate (Köppen climate classification Cfb). The average annual temperature is 9.9 °C (1961–1990), the sunlight annual average of 1669 hours (1991–2010). Hills Bray are provided to the precipitation of Beauvais. The precipitation is 669 mm on average per year (1981–2010), while it is 800 mm on average per year in Bray. However, the frequency of rainfall is high. The average number of days per year above the precipitation of a 1 mm is 116 days, or every third day. The fog is often present, it is estimated at about 55 days a year. The department is affected by 41 days of average wind year, usually it comes from the west to the south.

Population

The population data in the table and graph below refer to the commune of Beauvais proper, in its geography at the given years. The commune of Beauvais absorbed the former communes of Marissel, Saint-Just-des-Marais and Voisinlieu and part of Notre-Dame-du-Thil in 1943.

Sights

Cathedral 

The city's cathedral, dedicated to Saint Peter (Cathédrale Saint-Pierre de Beauvais), in some respects the most daring achievement of Gothic architecture, consists only of a transept and quire with apse and seven apse-chapels. The vaulting in the interior exceeds 46 m or 150 feet in height. The cathedral underwent a major repair and restoration process in 2008.

The small Romanesque church of the 10th century known as the Basse Oeuvre occupies the site destined for the nave; much of its east end was demolished to make room for the new cathedral.

Begun in 1247, under Bishop William of Grès (Guillaume de Grès, Guillaume de Grez), an extra  were added to the height, to make it the tallest cathedral in Europe: the work was interrupted in 1284 by the collapse of the vaulting of the choir, a disaster that produced a temporary failure of nerve among the masons working in Gothic style. The transept was built from 1500 to 1548. In 1573 the fall of a too-ambitious central tower stopped work again, after which little addition was made.

Its façades, especially that on the south, exhibit all the richness of the late Gothic style. The carved wooden doors of both the north and the south portals are masterpieces respectively of Gothic and Renaissance workmanship. The church possesses an elaborate astronomical clock (1866) and tapestries of the fifteenth and seventeenth centuries; but its chief artistic treasures are stained glass windows of the thirteenth, fourteenth and sixteenth centuries, the most beautiful of them from the hand of the Renaissance artist, Engrand Le Prince, a native of Beauvais. To him also is due some of the stained glass in St. Etienne, the second church of the town, and an interesting example of the transition stage between the Romanesque and Gothic styles.

During the Middle Ages, on 14 January, the Feast of Asses was celebrated in the Beauvais Cathedral, in commemoration of the Flight into Egypt.

Other notable sites 

In the Place de l'Hôtel de Ville and in the old streets near the cathedral there are several houses dating from the 12th to the 16th centuries. The Hôtel de ville, close to which stands the statue of Jeanne Hachette, was built in 1752.

The episcopal palace, now housing the Musée départemental de l'Oise, was built in the 16th century, partly upon the Gallo-Roman fortifications. The church of Saint-Étienne is a Romanesque-Gothic building (early 12th-late 16th centuries), including, in one of its transept's portals, a sculpture of "Wheel of Life".

Transport

Rail transport 
The railway station, Gare de Beauvais, opened since 1857 is currently served by several TER lines:
 Beauvais – PersanBeaumont – Paris Gare du Nord 
 Beauvais – Creil 
 Beauvais – Abancourt – Le Tréport

Air transport 

Beauvais–Tillé Airport, dating from the 1930s, lies in north of the city, in Tillé. It is used as a gateway to Paris by several low-cost carriers. Traffic growth is significant: in 1997, 200,000 passengers used it annually, but by 2006, it was more than 1.8 million. Airport usage increased by 40% a year on average between 2001 and 2005. The airport is mainly used for passenger traffic (only 2 to 3 flights involve freight each month) and serves 48 destinations.

Public transport 

The transit bus (commuter bus) network consists of 25 regular lines which serve Beauvais and its suburbs, including:

 12 day lines
 1 2 3 4 5 6 7 8 9 12 13 14
 3 Sunday lines
 11A 11B 11C
 3 summer lines
 10 (divided into 3 sub lines)
 7 Demand responsive transport lines
 T1 T2 T3 T5 T6 T7 T8
 3 shuttles
 Navette Aéroport (Airport Shuttle) Navette Parking (Parking Shuttle) Navette LaSalle (Polytechnic Institute of LaSalle Shuttle)

Environmentally friendly transportation 
In an effort to promote cleaner urban transportation and protect the environment, the city began to develop a "Green Plan" (Plan vert). Ultimately, the goal is to have a network of  bicycle paths.

Administration

The mayor of Beauvais is Franck Pia, elected in September 2022. He succeeded Caroline Cayeux, who stepped down to become a deputy minister in the Borne government.

Notable people 
 Milo of Nanteuil, bishop of Beauvais, builder of the Beauvais Cathedral
 Pierre Cauchon, bishop of Beauvais and judge of Joan of Arc
 Dominique Ansel, pastry chef and creator of the Cronut
 Guillaume Brenner, footballer
Fanny Dénoix (1798–1879), poet 
 Hubert de Givenchy, fashion designer
 Henri Lebesgue, mathematician
 Pierre Louvet (1617–1684), historian, archivist and historiographer
 Anthony Mfa Mezui, footballer
 Mustapha Yatabare, footballer
 Sambou Yatabare, footballer
 Jérôme Lempereur, footballer (born 1973)
 George Auriol, born Jean-Georges Huyot, graphic designer (26 April 1863)
 Arnaud Démare, pro-cyclist
 Clément Lenglet, footballer

Economy 
The industry of Beauvais comprises, besides the state manufacture of tapestry, which dates from 1664, the manufacture of various kinds of cotton and woollen goods, brushes, toys, boots and shoes, and bricks and tiles. Market-gardening flourishes in the vicinity and an extensive trade is carried on in grain and wine.

The town is the seat of a bishop, a prefect and a Court of Assizes; it has Tribunals of First Instance and of commerce, together with a Chamber of Commerce, a branch of the Bank of France, a higher ecclesiastical seminary, a lycée and training colleges.

Amongst the major companies operating in the town are Nestle and Agco (Massey Ferguson). Also present since 1986 is RS Components, founded by Jerry Vaughan, and now operating from a purpose built distribution centre to the east of the town

Beauvais also has a small airport, Beauvais Tillé, which is used by several low-cost carrier and charter airlines such as Ryanair as a terminal for nearby Paris, to which frequent shuttle buses run.

Education
Beauvais has the following schools:

Public schools:
20 preschools: Four in Argentine, five in Centre-Ville, one in Marissel, one in Notre Dame du Thil, five in Saint-Jean, one in Saint Just des Marais, two in Saint Lucien, and one in Voisinlieu
24 public elementary schools: Five in Argentine, six in Centre-Ville, two in Marissel, two in Notre Dame du Thil, five in Saint-Jean, one in Saint Just des Marais, two in Saint-Lucien, and one in Voisinlieu
Five junior high schools: Collège Henri Baumont, Collège Charles Fauqueux, Collège Jules Michelet, Collège Jean Baptiste Pellerin, and Collège George Sand
Four general high schools: Lycée Félix Faure, Lycée Jeanne Hachette, Lycée Paul Langevin, and Lycée François Truffaut
Four vocational high schools: Lycée Professionnel Paul Langevin, Lycée Professionnel Jean-Baptiste Corot, Lycée Professionnel Les Jacobins, and Lycée Agricole de l'Oise

Private schools:
Institution du Saint-Espirit (elementary, junior high, high school, and technological high school) 
Institution Notre-Dame (elementary and junior high school)
Elementary schools: École Saint-Paul and École Sainte-Bernadette
Lycée Saint-Vincent de Paul

Sport 
Beauvais is home to AS Beauvais Oise, a football club playing in the Championnat National, which is supported by a fine percussion band.

International relations

Beauvais is twinned with:
 Maidstone, United Kingdom, since 1961
 Witten, Germany, since 1975
 Setúbal, Portugal, since 1982
 Dej, Romania, since 2003
 Tczew, Poland, since 2003

See also 
 Roman Catholic Diocese of Beauvais
 Communes of the Oise department

Notes

References

Bibliography 
 Charles Delettre, Histoire du diocèse de Beauvais, depuis son établissement, Volume 2, Harvard Library

External links 

 Official website

 
Cities in France
Communes of Oise
Prefectures in France
Bellovaci